Paul Ramsey (born January 24, 1966) is an American rock drummer. He is a founding member of the progressive rock quintet echolyn.

Biography
Paul Ramsey is a drummer and percussionist born in Cheltenham, Pennsylvania. He has over 25 years experience performing and collaborating with various artists throughout the United States, Europe, and Canada. Ramsey is an experienced studio musician appearing on a variety of artists' works. Artists and engineers that have collaborated with Ramsey include T-Bone Wolk, Pete Moshay, Kevin Killen, Paul Bryan, Robert Hazard, Mike Mills, Jerry Marotta, Glenn Rosenstein, and Francis Dunnery.

Ramsey is a founding member of the progressive rock band echolyn. He was a member of New Jersey based folk rock band, Grey Eye Glances. Grey Eye Glances was signed to Mercury Records and was cited in 1997's Billboard Magazine's "Weekly Coverage for Hot Prospects for Prospects for Heatseekers Chart" for its innovative approach to touring utilizing Borders Books to reach new potential audiences. He is also a former member of the North Wales, PA alternative grunge rock band Winston’s Dog.

Influences
Ramsey has a variety of drumming and musical artist influences. He is drawn to innovative, tasteful, song-centric players who provide appropriate parts for the music. Phil Collins, John Bonham, Gary Husband, Mitch Mitchell, and Vinnie Colaiuta are among his top influences in this vein.

Equipment
Ramsey primarily plays a Pearl Masters Series kit (1994), Zildjian cymbals and Remo drumheads. For variety, he often adds unique "trash" elements to the kit such as 16” unmatched high hats or china cymbals. In the studio, Ramsey also plays on a Ludwig maple John Bonham-style kit featuring 26x14 bass drum.

Technique
Ramsey plays traditional grip as well as American match grip.

Discography

As Member

With echolyn
Echolyn (1991)
Suffocating the Bloom (1992)
...and every blossom (1993)
As the World (1995)
When the Sweet Turns Sour (1996)
To Cry You a Song: A Collection of Tull Tales (contribution) (1996)
Cowboy Poems Free (2000)
A Little Nonsense (Now and Then) (2002) (box set)
Mei (2002)
Progfest '94 (the Official Bootleg) (2002) (released for trading among fans)
Jersey Tomato, Volume 2 (Live at the Metlar-Bodine Museum) (2004)
Stars and Gardens, Volume 4 DVD (2004)
The End Is Beautiful (2005)
After the Storm: A Benefit Album for the Survivors of Hurricane Katrina (contribution) (2006)
echolyn (2012)
I Heard You Listening (2014)

With Grey Eye Glances

 Eventide, 1997
 One Day Soon, 1998
 Painted Pictures, 1998
 Grey Eye Glances 1992-98, 1999
 Grey Eye Glances 1998-99, 1999
 Grey Eye Glances Live Double CD, 1999
 If I Was, 2000 - 6 song EP
 A Little Voodoo, 2002
 Grey Eye Glances Live, 2003

With Francis Dunnery
There's a Whole New World Out There (Aquarian Nation, 2009)
Louder than Usual- DVD (Aquarian Nation/Flying Spot Entertainment, 2010)

With The Syn
Big Sky (Alliance Records, 2009)

With Mike Mills
Jesus Christ by Big Star for the Red Apple Foundation (2005)

With Brett Kull
Orangish, Blue (2002)
Last of the Curlews (2008)

With Still/Always Almost
God Pounds His Nails (1997)
Always Almost (1997)

With Ray Weston
This is My Halo (2003)

With Bob Dreher
A Once Upon a Time (2010)
Ch. 2, Finger Talk (2011)
Frohe, Weihnachten!, Schittervul! (2012)
Inside Out (2013)

With Lindsay McKay
Timeless (2012)

With Tiras Buck
The Guided Half Life (2014)

As Touring Drummer

With echolyn
1991-2016

With Grey Eye Glances
1997–2011

With Francis Dunnery
Tall Blond Helicopter Tour (2009)
There's a Whole New World Out There Tour (2010)
CKDCF Fundraising Event (2009, 2010, 2012)

With Scott Radway
Former Ghost Tour (2013)

External links
  Official Site
 Echolyn
 Brett Kull Producer/Engineer

References

1966 births
Living people
American jazz drummers
American rock drummers
Jazz fusion drummers
Progressive rock drummers
Musicians from Philadelphia
20th-century American drummers
American male drummers
Jazz musicians from Pennsylvania
20th-century American male musicians
American male jazz musicians